Justo José Caraballo (12 October 1914 – 16 September 2003) was an Argentine swimmer. He competed in the men's 200 metre breaststroke at the 1932 Summer Olympics.

References

1914 births
2003 deaths
Argentine male swimmers
Olympic swimmers of Argentina
Swimmers at the 1932 Summer Olympics
Swimmers from Buenos Aires
Male breaststroke swimmers